Debabrata Biswas (born 28 September 1945) is a politician and the General Secretary of the All India Forward Bloc from 1997. He was a Member of the Parliament of India representing West Bengal in the Rajya Sabha, the upper house of the Parliament.

He was Member of Rajya Sabha for four terms, 3-4-1990 to 2-4-1996, 3-4-1996 to 2-4-2002 and 3-4-2002 to 2-4-2008 and 3-4-2008 to 2-4-2014. However he resigned on 23-9-2008.

He was Leader of AIFB in Rajya Sabha. He is married to Shrimati Swapna Biswas and has one daughter. He resides in Kolkata.

References

External links
 Profile on Rajya Sabha website

All India Forward Bloc politicians
Rajya Sabha members from West Bengal
Living people
1945 births